No Escape is a video game developed by Bits Corporation and published by Psygnosis for the Sega Genesis and by Sony Imagesoft for the Super Nintendo Entertainment System, based on the film of the same name.

Gameplay
No Escape is a game in which the player is the inmate Robbins trying to escape the Absolom penal colony island.

Development and release
No Escape was released for two platforms: Super Nintendo Entertainment System and Sega Genesis. The never-released Sega CD version was planned to include this feature as well and was advertised, but was cancelled for unknown reasons.

Reception
Next Generation reviewed the Genesis version of the game, rating it one star out of five, and stated that "the only way to escape the annoying gameplay, repetitive soundtrack, and frustrating control is to not get caught buying this game!"

Reviews
GamePro (May, 1995)
Video Games & Computer Entertainment - May, 1995

References

1994 video games
Bits Studios games
Epic/Sony Records games
Platform games
Psygnosis games
Sega Genesis games
Sony Pictures video games
Super Nintendo Entertainment System games
Video games based on films
Video games developed in the United Kingdom